Minicoy, locally known as Maliku, is an island in Lakshadweep, India. Along with Viringili, it is on Maliku atoll, the southernmost atoll of Lakshadweep archipelago. Administratively, it is a census town in the Indian union territory of Lakshadweep. The island is situated 425 km west of Trivandrum, the capital city of Kerala.

Etymology
Minicoy is known as Maliku in the local language, Dhivehi, which is also the national and official language of the Republic of Maldives. The language is a descendant of Elu Prakrit and is closely related to the Sinhala language, but not mutually intelligible with it. However, the Lakhshadweep Administration refers to Dhivehi as Mahl. This is due to a misunderstanding on the part of a British civil servant who came to Minicoy in the 1900s during the time of the British Raj. The official asked a local what his language was and he replied "Dhivehi-bas". The official looked confused as he had never heard of this language. Noticing this, the islander said "Mahaldeebu" as he knew that locals on the subcontinent referred to the kingdom to the south (the Maldives) by that name. The civil servant then official recorded the language of Minicoy as Mahl.

The ancient name of Maliku was Mahiladū meaning women's island. Mahiladū derives from Elu Prakrit term Mahila du, which literally means woman-island. 
However, the name Maliku is thought to have been derived from the Arab trader's term for the island, Jazirat al-Maliku ('the island of the king'). 

Minicoy islanders have long settled in the Nicobar Islands across the Bay of Bengal. These settlers regularly travelled back to Minicoy. The Andaman and Nicobar Islands had a reputation in the Maldives and Minicoy of being inhabited by cannibals, and so collectively the Andaman and Nicobar groups were called "Minikaa-raajje" by Minicoy and Maldive islanders. This meant "cannibal kingdom".

A British official once asked a Minicoy islander what the name of his island was. The islander told the official that he was from Maliku but usually lived in "Minikaa-raajje" (Nicobar). The official thought Maliku and Minikaa were the same place and recorded the name of this islander's home as "Minikaa". This later became anglicised as Minicoy.

Little did this islander know that as a result of this cross-cultural exchange, his home would forever be called by a name that sounded like "cannibal" in his own language.

Geography

Minicoy is the second largest and the southernmost among the islands of the Lakshadweep archipelago. It is located 201 km to the southsouthwest of Kalpeni, at the southern end of the Nine Degree Channel and 125 km to the north of Thuraakunu, Maldives, at the northern end of the Eight Degree Channel. The atoll is 10 km in length, having a maximum breadth of about 6 km. The closest geographic feature is the Investigator Bank, a submerged shoal located 31 km to the northeast.

It is located 400 km west off the coast of Trivandrum. The atoll contains two islands. The main island is located on the eastern and southeastern side of the lagoon, along the reef fringe. It measures about 10 km from its northern end to its southernmost point and it is about 1 km wide in its southern half, while the northern half is a narrow sandspit, often less than 100 m wide. Minicoy is almost completely covered with coconut trees. One of the few landmarks of the island is a tall lighthouse. On the southern side of the main island lies the uninhabited islet of Viringili (also called the Small Pox Island), measuring barely 200 m in length. Formerly the lepers of Minicoy were banished to this island where they lived in abject conditions.

Maliku Atoll has a lagoon with two entrances in its northern side, Saalu Magu on the northeast and Kandimma Magu on the northwest. Its western side is fringed by a narrow reef and coral rocks awash. The interior of the lagoon is sandy and of moderate depth, rarely reaching 4 m. It has some coral patches.

This atoll is administered under the Indian Union Territory of Lakshadweep. Nine Degree Channel separates Minicoy and the Laccadive Islands. The closest island to Minicoy is Thuraakunu in the Republic of the Maldives. Since 1956, the Indian Government has forbidden the direct travelling between the two islands despite their geographic proximity and ethnographic similarities.

Maliku Kandu is the traditional name of the broad channel between Minicoy (Maliku) and Ihavandippulhu (Haa Alif Atoll) in the Maldives. In the Admiralty Charts it is called Eight Degree Channel. Other names for this channel are Addigiri Kandu and Māmalē Kandu. It appeared in old French maps with the name Courant de Malicut.

Villages
There are total of eleven villages on Minicoy Island. From north to south, they are:

 Kendiparty
 Pallessery
 Kudehi
 Funhilol
 Aloodi
 Sadivalu
 New Boduathiri
 Rammedu
 Boduathiri
 Aoumagu
 Bada

Climate

Minicoy has a tropical savanna climate (Köppen climate classification Aw) with warm temperatures throughout the year. Precipitation falls during most of the year; only January to March are relatively dry.

History

Buddhist era 

There are remains in an area of the island known as "Salliballu" dating back from Minicoy's Buddhist past, about 800 years ago. The most conspicuous archaeological sites are two mounds or large heaps of ruins belonging to a stupa and another related structure. These sites were investigated by the Archaeological Survey of India in the 1980s. The excavations yielded few discoveries, for the sites had been much damaged and vandalized previously. Still, a much-damaged large Buddha head was found buried in the area. The name "Salliballu" originated in the local name for the "Christian cross", because the locals say that an inscription with a "cross" was found there. But it is likely that, coming from a Buddhist site, it was a cross-shaped mandala or visvavajra, like those often found on inscriptions in archaeological remains in the Maldives.

Local oral tradition has it that Kamborani and Kohoratukamana, two princesses from the Maldives, came to Maliku. When they arrived, the Tivaru, who had been living there before, left the island for Sri Lanka. The Kamborani's descendants are the bodun (land and shipowners) and the descendants of Kohoratukamana are the niamin (captains). The other status groups are made up of the descendants of their crew.

Colonial era

Under suzerainty of East India Company 

According to the documented evidence, Minicoy Atoll has been under Indian administrations since the mid 16th century.

Until the 16th century, the Laccadives was under the suzerainty of the Kolathiri Raja of Chirakkal in what is now the Indian state of Kerala. With the Portuguese ascendancy in the region, it became necessary for the Kolathiri to transfer sovereignty of the islands to their hereditary admiral, the Ali Raja of Kolathunadu (Cannanore).

However, the kings and queens of the Maldives also issued edicts addressed to the subjects in their realm Malikaddu Midhemedhu. This meant "Between Maliku (Minicoy) and Addu". Previously Addu was the southernmost island in the dominions of the Maldive kings and was in Addu Atoll.

Under direct rule of British India 

In 1857, suzerainty over Minicoy transferred from the East India Company to the Indian Empire when Queen Victoria was proclaimed Empress. On 18 December 1790 Maliku was surrendered to the Court of Directors of the British East India Company by the Ali Raja Cannanore, Junumabe Ali-Adi Raja Bibi II. The Ali Raja was allowed to administer Maliku in return for a tribute to the East India Company. She continued to dispute the transfer of sovereignty but in 1824, her successor, Mariambe Ali-Adi Raja Bibi made a formal written recognition of the suzerainty of the East India Company over Maliku (Minicoy). She and her successors, however, continued the tributary arrangement. On 27 July 1795, the Governor General of the Presidency of Madras under whose jurisdiction Minicoy was, abolished Junumabe Ali Adi-Raja Bibi's monopoly over coir trade. In 1905 under the heavy burden of debts to the Empire, Mohamed Ali-Adi Raja of Cannanore agreed to surrender sovereignty and control over Minicoy. He died before the formal transfer. After an attempt to backtrack, his successor Imbicchi Ali-Adi Raja Bibi finally signed over Minicoy to the Emperor Edward VII on 9 February 1909, backdated to 1 July 1905. Following this, Minicoy was annexed to the District of Malabar.

After independence of India

1956 plebiscite and integration with India 

After the independence of India in August 1947, the possessions of the Emperor of India passed to either the Indian Union or Pakistan according to an agreed demarcation line. The rulers of the princely state of British India had the choice of acceding to either India or Pakistan. Since Minicoy was earlier in a sovereign possession of the British Raj, India held a plebiscite in Minicoy in 1956 to determine whether or not the people of Minicoy wished to join the Indian Union. A referendum was held and an absolute majority of the Minicoy decided to join the Indian Union.

Union Territory of India 

After the plebiscite, on 1 November 1956, Minicoy was incorporated into the Union Territory of Laccadive, Minicoy, and Aminidivi Islands, renamed Lakshadweep in 1973. At this time, the Maldives was still not independent from the British.

India-Maldives maritime treaty 

In December 1976, India and the Maldives signed a maritime boundary treaty whereby Minicoy was placed on the Indian side of the boundary. India and Maldives officially and amicably decided their maritime boundary in 1976, in 1982 when the brother of the President of Maldives Maumoon Abdul Gayoom declared that the neighbouring Minicoy Island that belonged to India were a part of Maldives; Maldives quickly and officially denied that it was laying claim to the island.

India and Maldives continue to enjoy friendly relations and a strategic partnership in economic and military fields. India continues to contribute to the security of the island nation of Maldives.

Demographics
 India census, the island of Minicoy had a population of 9,495. Males constitute 49% of the population and females 51%. Minicoy has an average literacy rate of 82%, higher than the national average of 74.04%: male literacy is 84%, and female literacy is 80%. In Minicoy, 12% of the population is under 6 years of age.

Transport
MV Corals, MV Lagoons, MV Amindivi, MV Arabian Sea, MV Bharat Seema, MV Dweep Setu, MV Kavaratti, MV Lakshadweep Sea and MV Minicoy are the important passenger ships connecting Lakshadweep with Kerala. The passage takes between 14 and 20 hours.

Agatti Airport is the only civilian airport in Lakshadweep. Helicopter transfer is available from Agatti to Kavaratti throughout the year. The flight from Cochin to Agatti takes approximately one hour thirty minutes. Flights operate six days a week. The Government of India is planning to develop an airport at Minicoy Island to boost tourism and promote tuna fishing industry for improving livelihoods in Lakshadweep.

The Lakshadweep authorities are seeking an opportunity to invest in Port City of Kerala Kollam. They are ready to invest in a passenger terminal with dormitory facilities and an office to guide the people of Minicoy reaching Kollam Port. Traditionally, Lakshadweep's connections with the mainland have been through Kollam, Kochi and Beypore ports. But Minicoy, a small atoll at the southernmost end of the archipelago, is closer to Kollam than to either Kochi or Beypore.

Notable people
Ali Manikfan, born 1938

Image gallery

References

Bibliography
 Bell, H.C.P.: The Maldive Islands, An account of the physical features, History, Inhabitants, Productions and Trade. Colombo 1883.
 Ellis, R.H.: A Short Account of the Laccadive Islands and Minicoy. Government Press, Madras, 1924.
 Kattner, Ellen: The Social Structure of Maliku (Minicoy). In: International Institute of Asian Studies (IIAS) Newsletter. Nr. 10, 1996, S. 19–20. (Online at http://www.maldivesroyalfamily.com/minicoy_kattner.shtml).
 Kattner, Ellen: Bodu Valu – Big Ponds: Traditional Water Management and its socio-cosmic Implications in Minicoy/Maliku, an Indian Ocean island. In: Ohlig, Christoph (ed.) Antike Zisternen. Publikationen der Deutschen Wasserhistorischen Gesellschaft, 9. Norderstedt: Books on Demand GmbH, 2007, pp. 145–172.
 Xavier Romero-Frias, The Maldive Islanders, A Study of the Popular Culture of an Ancient Ocean Kingdom. Barcelona 1999, 
 Divehi Tārīkhah Au Alikameh. Divehi Bahāi Tārikhah Khidmaiykurā Qaumī Markazu. Reprint 1958 edn. Male' 1990.
 Divehiraajjege Jōgrafīge Vanavaru. Muhammadu Ibrahim Lutfee. G.Sōsanī.
 "The Encyclopaedia of Islam", new edition, Index Volume, Fascicule 2, Glossary and Index of Terms, Bill, 2006, LARGE book-size paperback, 592 pages, .
Das, Nrupal: Minicoy Island: Beaches, Culture and People of Minicoy, Lakshadweep Islands. 2018, Kindle, 37 Pages (Available Online – Minicoy, Lakshadwweep Islands)

External links

 Minicoy Tourism Guide
 Information about Minicoy Island
 A Language dies in India
 Amateur (Ham) Radio Special Event Station VU7M of Minicoy Lighthouse ILLW 2012

 
Islands of Lakshadweep
India–Maldives border
Islands of India
Populated places in India
Islands of the Bay of Bengal